Searcy County Airport  is a county-owned, public-use airport in Searcy County, Arkansas, United States. It is located one nautical mile (2 km) southwest of the central business district of Marshall, Arkansas. This airport is included in the National Plan of Integrated Airport Systems for 2011–2015, which categorized it as a general aviation facility.

Facilities and aircraft 
Searcy County Airport covers an area of 129 acres (52 ha) at an elevation of 963 feet (294 m) above mean sea level. It has one runway designated 5/23 with an asphalt surface measuring 4,003 by 75 feet (1,220 x 23 m).

For the 12-month period ending May 31, 2010, the airport had 600 general aviation aircraft operations, an average of 50 per month. At that time there were two single-engine aircraft based at this airport.

References

External links 
 Searcy County Airport (4A5) at Arkansas Department of Aeronautics
 Aerial image as of February 2001 from USGS The National Map
 
 

Airports in Arkansas
Transportation in Searcy County, Arkansas
Buildings and structures in Searcy County, Arkansas